Mark Greif (born 1975) is an author, educator and cultural critic. His most recent book is Against Everything. One of the co-founders of n+1, he is a frequent contributor to the magazine and writes for numerous other publications. Greif currently teaches English at Stanford University.

Background and education
Greif received a BA in History and Literature from Harvard in 1997, after which he received a Marshall Scholarship, which he used to study British Literature and 19th and 20th century American Literature at Oxford through 1999. He holds a PhD in American studies from Yale.

Stanford
Greif is associate professor of English at Stanford University.

n+1
In the fall of 2004, along with fellow writers and editors Keith Gessen, Chad Harbach, Benjamin Kunkel, and Marco Roth, Greif launched the literary journal n + 1. Greif has served as both an editor and writer for the journal, contributing essays on a wide variety of topics: politics, sociology, Radiohead. In 2010, he described the journal's mission: “We are creating a long print archive in an era of the short sound bite.”

Criticism
Greif's criticism is marked by a willingness to address pop culture, conservative books, and leftist academic critical theory, and to link these to literature and larger questions of culture.

References

Works by Greif
Books
 The Age of the Crisis of Man, 2015
Against Everything: Essays, 2016
Articles in n+1
"Against Exercise," Fall 2004.
"Mogadishu, Baghdad, Troy," Fall 2004.
"The Concept of Experiences," Spring 2005.
"Radiohead, or the Philosophy of Pop," Fall 2005.
"Afternoon of the Sex Children," Winter 2006, reprinted as 'Children of the Revolution', Harpers Magazine November 2006
"Notes From An Occupation" (the Occupy Wall Street demonstrators),  with Astra Taylor,  Fall,  2011

Reviews
"On Giorgio Agamben: Apocalypse Deferred," Spring 2005.
"On Reality TV," Fall 2005.
"The Hipster in the Mirror", New York Times, November 12, 2010.
Web
"The Tattoo"

External links
New School - Bio as Assistant Professor, Literary Studies, Eugene Lang College
n+1 magazine - The magazine that Greif edits and frequently contributes to
Articles by Mark Greif from the London Review of Books.
Articles by Mark Greif from The American Prospect.
Mark Greif on Mark McGurl, The Program Era
Mark Greif on Hannah Arendt from Dissent, Spring 2004.
Mark Greif on Michel Houellebecq from Dissent, Fall 2003.
"Digging for Goldwater" Very short review by Greif, The Village Voice, (April 19, 2001).
"Schnitzler on Tap" Very short review by Greif in The Village Voice, (January 30 - February 5, 2002).
"The Great American Novel" - An audio discussion between Greif, James Wood, and Lydon, in response to The New York Times Book Review solicited top twenty-five best books of the last quarter-century, (May 23, 2006).

American male journalists
Living people
Harvard College alumni
1975 births
Alumni of the University of Oxford
Yale University alumni
Marshall Scholars